Guilliam is a given name. Notable people with the name include:

Guilliam van Deynum ( 1575–after 1624), Flemish painter, illuminator and miniaturist
Guilliam du Gardijn (1595/1596–1647/1657), Dutch painter
Guilliam Visagie ( 1751–after 1793), Cape Colony trekboer